The Barbagia of Seulo is a historical subregion of central-eastern Sardinia, Italy. It includes the communes of Seulo, Seui, Sadali, Esterzili and Ussassai.

Geography of Sardinia